Thomas Ravis (c. 1560 – 14 December 1609) was a Church of England bishop and academic. He was among those engaged in translating the King James Bible.

Early life
Ravis was born at Old Malden in Surrey, probably in 1560, and educated at Westminster School. He was elected, on the recommendation of Lord Burghley, to Christ Church, Oxford, in 1575, but the dean and chapter declined to admit him on the grounds that there was no room, until Burghley remonstrated with them. He gained a BA on 12 November 1578 and an MA on 3 March 1582, proceeding to a bachelor's divinity degree in 1589 and a divinity doctorate in 1595.

Priestly career
Ravis took holy orders in 1582 and preached around Oxford for some time. On 17 April 1588 he was elected a proctor and in July 1596 and again in July 1597 was chosen Vice-Chancellor of the University of Oxford. In 1591 he was admitted to the rectory of Merstham, Surrey, and from 27 December of the same year until May 1598 was vicar of All Hallows, Barking. From February 1593 till 1607 he was a prebendary of Westminster, and from 1596 until 1605 an authoritarian Dean of Christ Church. As Dean he commuted the commons allowance for food into monetary form, of two shillings a week. Some of those who resisted this innovation he expelled, others he sent before the council, and others he imprisoned.

On 7 July 1598 he became vicar of Islip, and in the following October vicar of Wittenham Abbas, Berkshire. He was one of the six deans who attended the Hampton Court Conference in 1604, and later supplied notes for William Barlow's account, the Sum and Substance of the Conference. He was then involved in the subsequent creation of the King James Bible, being appointed one of the Oxford committee deputed to translate part of the New Testament. Also in that year, he was elected prolocutor of the lower house of Convocation.

Episcopal career
In October 1604 Ravis was appointed Bishop of Gloucester and consecrated on 17 March 1605; he was allowed to hold in commendam with his bishopric the deanery of Christ Church, his Westminster prebend, and the parsonages of Islip and Wittenham. At Gloucester he improved the Bishop's Palace. On 18 May 1607 Ravis was translated to the episcopal see of London and installed as Bishop of London on 2 June. He was intolerant of all nonconformity. Ravis died on 14 December 1609, and was buried in the north aisle of St Paul's Cathedral.

Notes

References

1560 births
1609 deaths
Deans of Christ Church, Oxford
Bishops of Gloucester
Bishops of London
Translators of the King James Version
People from Surrey
People educated at Westminster School, London
16th-century English translators
17th-century English clergy
17th-century translators
16th-century scholars
17th-century scholars
17th-century Anglican theologians
16th-century Anglican theologians